María López de Eguilaz Zubiria (born 12 July 1984) is a Spanish field hockey goalkeeper who competed at the 2008 and 2016 Summer Olympics.

López took up field hockey aged eight, and became a goalkeeper at ten. She was included to the national team in 2005, and in 2015 named Best Goalkeeper of the Spanish Division de Honor. She coached goalkeepers at Real Club Josaleta.

References

External links
 

1984 births
Living people
Spanish female field hockey players
Female field hockey goalkeepers
Olympic field hockey players of Spain
Field hockey players at the 2008 Summer Olympics
Field hockey players at the 2016 Summer Olympics
Expatriate field hockey players
Spanish expatriate sportspeople in the Netherlands
Sportspeople from Getxo
SV Kampong players
Sportspeople from Biscay
Field hockey players from the Basque Country (autonomous community)